Suburban Kids with Biblical Names is a Swedish twee pop band consisting of Johan Hedberg and Peter Gunnarsson. The band was formed in December 2003, in Haninge. Their name comes from a lyric in the song "People" by the Silver Jews.

History
In the beginning of 2004, the band put two songs on the internet and received warm listener response. After this, Sonic magazine interviewed them and included one of their songs on a compilation CD. They were signed to Labrador Records and released their first EP, #1. In 2005, they released their second EP, #2.  Their debut album #3 was released in October 2005 in Sweden and has subsequently been released by Minty Fresh in the US and by Yesboyicecream Records in the UK and Ireland. Their song "Rent a Wreck" from #3 is featured in the Prius "Yes" commercial.

On 4 February 2009, the band released their third EP, #4.

Discography

Albums
#3 (2005)

EPs
#1 (2004)
#2 (2005)
#4 (2009)

Singles
"Loop Duplicate My Heart" (2007)

References

External links
Labrador Records
yesboyicecream records

Musical groups established in 2003
Swedish indie pop groups